NC 16, is the first studio album by Singaporean duo By2. It was released on July 25, 2008, with a total of 11 tracks with 6 promotional singles.

Commercial performance
Following the release of the album, the album peaked at number 6 on Taiwan's G-Music chart during the week from July 14 to 25.

Composition
All the songs of the album was written by their label and By2.

Track listing

References

2008 albums
By2 albums
Chinese-language albums